Ho Chi Minh City II Women's Football Club is a Vietnam women's football club, based in Ho Chi Minh City, Vietnam. The team plays in the Vietnam women's football championship.

The team is currently playing at Thống Nhất Stadium.

History 
Hồ Chí Minh City II W.F.C. was founded in 2015 with the name Tao Đàn. The club is the youth team of Hồ Chí Minh City I W.F.C.

Honours

Domestic competitions

League
 Vietnam women's football championship
  Winners (0)

Current squad
As of 2017

References

External links
 

Women's football in Vietnam